Mariana Shevchuk (born 22 May 1996, Khmilnyk) is a Ukrainian Paralympic powerlifter. She won the gold medal in the women's 55 kg at the 2020 Summer Paralympics held in Tokyo, Japan.  A few months later, she won the gold medal in her event at the 2021 World Para Powerlifting Championships held in Tbilisi, Georgia. At this event, she also set a new world record of 133.5 kg.

References

External links
 

Living people
1996 births
Powerlifters at the 2016 Summer Paralympics
Powerlifters at the 2020 Summer Paralympics
Paralympic gold medalists for Ukraine
Paralympic medalists in powerlifting
Paralympic powerlifters of Ukraine
Sportspeople from Vinnytsia Oblast
21st-century Ukrainian women